The Chester Raft Race is an annual charity event taking place every July on the River Dee in Chester, organised by Chester Round Table

The rafts race against the clock over a quarter mile (400 m) course, starting by the rowing club, and passing under pedestrian suspension bridge. Until 2013 it continued down the weir and finished on the south bank above the road bridge. Although the race is over at this point, the remnants of the rafts and crew then had to retrace their route back up the weir and return to the site assembly/parking area (The Meadows).

No races were held in 2020 or 2021 due to the COVID-19 Pandemic.

2014 event
The 2014 event was held on 6 July and featured a display of flyboarding by Jay St John.
Forty rafts took part, and the winner with the fastest time of 9m 20s was Cheshire Waste and Skip Hire with In The Navy. Winner of the theme prize was Marshall Air Services with a complete floating jet-fighter tribute to Top Gun. The best pub entry was by Old Harkers Arms with a Yellow Submarine tribute to the Beatles. Best ladies raft was I Am Sailing, entered by The Druids Inn. The best school entry was Queens Lower School with The Queen of Hearts.

The main sponsor of the event was Survitec Group, a global specialist in marine safety equipment. 
In 2014 a new finish line was introduced at a point above the weir; this eliminated a risky descent of the weir.
The Rotary Club of Chester donated proceeds from the race to Cheshire Young Carers and other local causes.

Covid Postponements
The event was postponed in 2020 & 2021  due to the restriction imposed on large gatherings during the COVID-19 lockdowns. Plans were put in place for the 2022 Chester Raft Race at this time the organisation of the event would transfer to Chester Grosvenor 76 Round Table.

Chester Raft Race 2022
After 2 years of a Covid enforced hiatus the 2022 Event was announced for Sunday July 3, 2022 with the event receiving a new rebranded logo. The theme for the event was also confirmed as "100 Years of British Television" and the event Charity was announced with profits from the event going to the Countess of Chester Hospital - Blue Skies Balcony Appeal.

A brand new Event sponsor was announced as Salt Town Contractors

As of the 23rd of May 20 Rafts were signed up for the event with many returning entrants from previous years, as well as some new entries for Chester Raft Race 2022.

Winners

References

External links
www.chesterraftrace.org.uk

Chester
Raft races
River Dee, Wales